Esther Kwan Wing-ho, born 16 July 1964 is a Hong Kong retired actress formerly contracted to TVB and ATV.

Career
Kwan began her acting career after high school at ATV from 1988 to 1993. She moved over to TVB in 1993 and has been at the broadcaster on and off. Kwan met Hong Kong actor Nick Cheung while she was still working for ATV. The couple married on 8 November 2004 in Australia. Their daughter, Brittany Cheung (張童) was born on 24 January 2006. In 2008, Kwan left acting to spend more time with her daughter, only returning to film two TVB dramas The Season of Fate (2010) and Always and Ever (2013).

She is fluent in Cantonese, Mandarin and English.

Filmography

Television

Awards

 1999 Nextmedia Awards ~ Top Ten TV Celebrities [6th place]
 1999 Nextmedia Awards ~ Top Ten TV Programs ["Burning Flame" in 4th place; "Armed Reaction" in 6th place]
 1998 Top Ten Couples [w/ real-life partner, Nick Cheung] ~ hailed as showbiz's "Golden Couple"
 1999 RTHK Radio 2 Awards ~ 1998 Best TV Couple[w/ Bobby Au Yeung]
 1998 RTHK's Number One Celebrity Awards ~ No.1 Best Performing Artist[Voted by Public]
 1998 NextMedia Awards ~ Top Ten TV Celebrities [1st Runner Up]
 1997 RTHK Awards ~ Best Performing Actress [Gold]
 1997 TVB Best Actress Award
 1997 TVB Best Couple Award (along w/ Bobby Au Yeung)

References

 
 Esther's Biography

|-
! colspan="3" style="background: #DAA520;" | TVB Anniversary Awards

1964 births
Living people
TVB veteran actors
Hong Kong television actresses
20th-century Hong Kong actresses
21st-century Hong Kong actresses